Gumastha is a 1953 Tamil language film starring V. Nagayya, R. S. Manohar and Pandari Bai. The film was produced in Tamil and Telugu under the same title.

Plot 
Ranganathan is a government clerk struggling in life with a low salary and a big family. He has to support his aged father, his wife, two children, his brother Gopu and an unmarried sister, Susheela.

Though Gopu is a smart young man, he couldn't continue his college education due to the financial situation in the family.
In the meantime, a rich man's son, Ravi meets Susheela and is attracted to her. Eventually, they both become lovers.
Ravi has a medical problem in the heart. The doctor advises him against marriage. But he dismisses it and marries Susheela. She learns of Ravi's medical condition and refuses to be intimate with him. However, one day Ravi forces and make love to her due to which she becomes pregnant.

People, who know about Ravi's medical condition, suspects Susheela as carrying someone else's child. She becomes distressed. Her old father, learning about her plight, dies of shock.

How the government clerk Ranganathan, her brother, solves the problems forms the rest of the story.

Cast 
Cast adapted from the songbook

Male Cast
 V. Nagayya as Clerk Ranganathan
 Manohar as Brother Gopu
 P. V. Narasimha Bharathi as Ravi
 Friend Ramasami as Ravi's Friend
 T. N. Sivathanu as Ravi's Father
 M. L. N. Kaushik as Shankar
 C. V. V. Panthulu as Shankar's Father
 T. V. Sethuraman as Friend's Father
 V. K. Karthikeyan as Harmonium Player
 Karuppaiah as Astrologer
 P. Sundarabashyam Naidu as Ranganathan's Father
 Balan as Gupta
 V. T. Kalyanam as Homeowners's Clerk
 Bhairavan as Ranganathan's Son (Adult)
 P. Kalyanam as Ranganathan's Son's Friend
 Anil Kumar as Ranganathan's Son (Child)

Female Cast
 Pandari Bai as Ranganathan's Sister, Susheela
 B. Jayamma as Seetha
 C. K. Saraswathi as Ravi's Mother
 M. Saroja as Pappi
 Menaka as Rani
 Angamuthu as Milkmaid
 Venu Bai as Shankar's Mother
 Baby Uma as Ranganathan's Daughter

Production 
The film was produced by V. C. Subburaman under the banner Aruna Films and was shot at Film Centre, Madras.

Soundtrack 
Music was scored by C. N. Pandurangam, G. Ramanathan, Nagayya and while the lyrics were penned by A. Maruthakasi and S. D. S. Yogiar.

External links

References 

1953 films
1950s Tamil-language films
Indian black-and-white films
Indian drama films
Tamil films remade in other languages
1953 drama films
Films scored by C. N. Pandurangan
Films scored by G. Ramanathan
Films scored by Nagayya